Tien Tzu-chieh (born 19 January 1995) is a badminton player from Taiwan. He is a men's doubles and mixed doubles specialist.

Achievements

BWF World Junior Championships 
Boys' doubles

BWF International Challenge/Series 
Men's doubles

  BWF International Challenge tournament
  BWF International Series tournament
  BWF Future Series tournament

References

External links 
 

1995 births
Living people
Taiwanese male badminton players